Olli Toomik (born 6 November 1938 Narva) is an Estonian physician and politician. He was a member of VII Riigikogu.

References

Living people
1938 births
Members of the Riigikogu, 1992–1995
Politicians from Narva